Feng Zhuoyi (Chinese: 冯卓毅; born June 18, 1989) is a Chinese football player for Chengdu Better City where he plays as a defensive midfielder.

Club career
Feng started his senior career with Chengdu Blades in 2009. He scored his first senior goal on 7 April 2012, in a 2–2 away draw against Fujian Smart Hero. Feng transferred to Chinese Super League side Guangzhou R&F on 31 January 2013. He made his debut for Guangzhou on 21 May 2013 in a 2013 Chinese FA Cup match against Chongqing FC. He made his league debut four days later in a 3–2 home win against Dalian Aerbin.

On 26 February 2016, Feng transferred to fellow Chinese Super League side Henan Jianye. He made his debut for Henan on 5 March 2016 in a 1–0 home win against Shanghai SIPG. On 2 July 2016, Feng scored his first goal for Henan in the last minute of a league match against Beijing Guoan, which ensured Henan's 1–0 victory.

On 24 March 2020, Feng returned to Chengdu to join second tier football club Chengdu Better City. He made his debut for the club in a league game on 12 September 2020 against Beijing Chengfeng in a 3-2 victory, where he also scored his first goal for the club. After two seasons with the club he would establish himself as a regular within the team and aid them to promotion at the end of the 2021 league campaign.

Career statistics 
Statistics accurate as of match played 8 January 2023.

References

External links
 

1989 births
Living people
Chinese footballers
Chengdu Tiancheng F.C. players
Guangzhou City F.C. players
Henan Songshan Longmen F.C. players
Chengdu Better City F.C. players
Footballers from Wuhan
Chinese Super League players
China League One players
Association football midfielders
21st-century Chinese people